Melipilla Airport,  is a small general aviation airport adjacent to the east side of Melipilla, a city in the Santiago Metropolitan Region of Chile.

There are nearby hills to the north of the airport and, along with the city, it sits in the Maipo Valley. The runway has an additional  of unpaved overrun on the west end.

See also

Transport in Chile
List of airports in Chile

References

External links
OpenStreetMap - Melipilla
OurAirports - Melipilla
FallingRain - Melipilla Airport

Airports in Chile
Airports in Santiago Metropolitan Region